K. M. Abraham may refer to:
 K. M. Abraham (politician) (1919–2006), Indian politician
 K. M. Abraham (civil servant) (born 1958), Indian civil servant
 K. M. Abraham (scientist) (born 1945), American scientist